The 2011–12 Orlando Magic season was the 23rd season of the franchise in the National Basketball Association (NBA). The team finished in 6th place in the Eastern Conference with a 37–29 record in a regular season shortened by the lockout and an offseason where trade rumours that included starting center Dwight Howard abounded. After the Magic's playoff loss against the Indiana Pacers in the first round of the playoffs in five games, the Orlando franchise parted ways with head coach Stan Van Gundy and general manager Otis Smith. The Amway Center, the Magic's home court, was the venue of the 2012 NBA All-Star Game.

This season also marked the end of an era as Dwight Howard, along with Steve Nash from the Phoenix Suns, was traded to the Los Angeles Lakers in the 2012 off-season. The Magic would not earn a playoff berth again until the 2018–19 season when Dwight was with the Washington Wizards.

Key dates
 June 23: The 2011 NBA draft took place at Prudential Center in Newark, New Jersey.
 December 18: The Magic had the first of their two-game preseason against Miami at American Airlines Arena.
 December 25: The regular season begins and the Magic have an away game at Oklahoma City. This is the Magic's first regular season game. They lost the season opener 89-97.
 December 26: The Magic had their first home game of the regular season at the Amway Center. They played the Houston Rockets. The Magic also achieved their first win of the season, with a score of 104-95.
 April 15: Orlando secures a playoff spot with a 100–84 win against the Cleveland Cavaliers.

Draft picks

Roster

Roster Notes
 Center Dwight Howard played 54 games (his last game being on April 7, 2012) but missed the remainder of the season and the playoffs after undergoing back surgery to repair a herniated disk which also led to him missing the 2012 Summer Olympics in London.

Pre-season
Due to the 2011 NBA lockout negotiations, the programmed pre-season schedule, along with the first two weeks of the regular season were scrapped, and a two-game pre-season was set for each team once the lockout concluded.

|- bgcolor="#ffcccc"
| 1
| December 18
| @ Miami
| 
| Ryan Anderson, JJ Redick (22)
| Ryan Anderson (8)
| Jameer Nelson (7)
| American Airlines Arena20,100
| 0–1
|- bgcolor="ccffcc"
| 2
| December 21
| Miami
| 
| Glen Davis (18)
| Dwight Howard (9)
| Jameer Nelson (10)
| Amway Center19,045
| 1–1

Regular season

Standings

Game log

|- bgcolor="#ffcccc"
| 1
| December 25
| @ Oklahoma City
| 
| Ryan Anderson (25)
| Dwight Howard (15)
| Jameer Nelson (6)
| Chesapeake Energy Arena18,203
| 0–1
|- bgcolor="#ccffcc"
| 2
| December 26
| Houston
| 
| Hedo Türkoğlu (23)
| Dwight Howard (7)
| Jameer Nelson (6)
| Amway Center18,846
| 1–1
|- bgcolor="#ccffcc"
| 3
| December 29
| New Jersey
| 
| Ryan Anderson (22)
| Dwight Howard (24)
| Hedo Türkoğlu (7)
| Amway Center18,954
| 2–1
|- bgcolor=#ccffcc
| 4
| December 30
| @ Charlotte
|  
| Ryan Anderson (23)
| Dwight Howard (24)
| Chris Duhon (6)
| Time Warner Cable Arena18,064
| 3–1

|- bgcolor="#ccffcc"
| 5
| January 1
| Toronto
| 
| Ryan Anderson (24)
| Dwight Howard (15)
| Hedo Türkoğlu (7)
| Amway Center18,846
| 4–1
|- bgcolor="#ffcccc"
| 6
| January 2
| @ Detroit
| 
| Dwight Howard (19)
| Dwight Howard (7)
| Jameer Nelson (5)
| The Palace of Auburn Hills8,120
| 4–2
|- bgcolor="#ccffcc"
| 7
| January 4
| Washington
| 
| Dwight Howard (28)
| Dwight Howard (20)
| Jameer Nelson (9)
| Amway Center18,846
| 5–2
|- bgcolor="#ffcccc"
| 8
| January 6
| Chicago
| 
| Dwight Howard (28)
| Dwight Howard (15)
| Chris Duhon (4)
| Amway Center18,912
| 5–3
|- bgcolor="#ccffcc"
| 9
| January 8
| @ Sacramento
| 
| Jason Richardson (22)
| Dwight Howard (11)
| Jameer Nelson (6)
| Power Balance Pavilion14,150
| 6–3
|- bgcolor="#ccffcc"
| 10
| January 11
| @ Portland
| 
| JJ Redick (17)
| Dwight Howard (13)
| Hedo Türkoğlu (6)
| Rose Garden20,467
| 7–3
|- bgcolor="#ccffcc"
| 11
| January 12
| @ Golden State
| 
| Dwight Howard (45)
| Dwight Howard (23)
| Hedo Türkoğlu (9)
| Oracle Arena17,754
| 8–3
|- bgcolor="#ccffcc"
| 12
| January 16
| @ New York
| 
| Ryan Anderson (30)
| Dwight Howard (10)
| Jameer Nelson (7)
| Madison Square Garden19,763
| 9–3
|- bgcolor="#ccffcc"
| 13
| January 17
| Charlotte
| 
| Dwight Howard (25)
| Dwight Howard (17)
| Dwight Howard, Jameer Nelson (4)
| Amway Center18,846
| 10–3
|- bgcolor="#ffcccc"
| 14
| January 18
| San Antonio
| 
| Dwight Howard (24)
| Dwight Howard (25)
| Jameer Nelson (5)
| Amway Center18,846
| 10–4
|- bgcolor="#ccffcc"
| 15
| January 20
| L. A. Lakers
| 
| Dwight Howard (21)
| Dwight Howard (23)
| Jameer Nelson (9)
| Amway Center18,846
| 11–4
|- bgcolor="#ffcccc"
| 16
| January 23
| @ Boston
| 
| Dwight Howard (18)
| Dwight Howard (14)
| Dwight Howard, Jameer Nelson (3)
| TD Garden18,624
| 11–5
|- bgcolor="#ccffcc"
| 17
| January 24
| @ Indiana
| 
| Ryan Anderson (24)
| Dwight Howard (9)
| Hedo Türkoğlu (8)
| Bankers Life Fieldhouse12,760
| 12–5
|- bgcolor="#ffcccc"
| 18
| January 26
| Boston
| 
| Dwight Howard (16)
| Dwight Howard (16)
| Hedo Türkoğlu (7)
| Amway Center18,952
| 12–6
|- bgcolor="#ffcccc"
| 19
| January 27
| @ New Orleans
| 
| Dwight Howard (28)
| Dwight Howard (16)
| Chris Duhon (5)
| New Orleans Arena16,176
| 12–7
|- bgcolor="#ffcccc"
| 20
| January 29
| Indiana
| 
| Dwight Howard (24)
| Dwight Howard (13)
| Hedo Türkoğlu (7)
| Amway Center18,952
| 12–8
|- bgcolor="#ffcccc"
| 21
| January 30
| @ Philadelphia
| 
| Dwight Howard (17)
| Ryan Anderson (20)
| Quentin Richardson (3)
| Wells Fargo Center16,299
| 12–9

|- bgcolor="#ccffcc"
| 22
| February 1
| Washington
| 
| Dwight Howard, Ryan Anderson (23)
| Dwight Howard (18)
| Hedo Türkoğlu (5)
| Amway Center18,846
| 13–9
|- bgcolor="#ccffcc"
| 23
| February 3
| Cleveland
| 
| Dwight Howard, Jason Richardson (19)
| Dwight Howard (16)
| Chris Duhon (5)
| Amway Center18,933
| 14–9
|- bgcolor="#ccffcc"
| 24
| February 4
| @ Indiana
| 
| Dwight Howard (27)
| Hedo Türkoğlu (10)
| Chris Duhon, Jason Richardson (5)
| Bankers Life Fieldhouse18,165
| 15–9
|- bgcolor="#ffcccc"
| 25
| February 6
| L. A. Clippers
| 
| Dwight Howard (33)
| Dwight Howard (14)
| Jameer Nelson (12)
| Amway Center18,846
| 15–10
|- bgcolor="#ccffcc"
| 26
| February 8
| Miami
| 
| Ryan Anderson (27)
| Dwight Howard (24)
| Hedo Türkoğlu (7)
| Amway Center18,972
| 16–10
|- bgcolor="#ffcccc"
| 27
| February 10
| Atlanta
| 
| Ryan Anderson (21)
| Dwight Howard (18)
| Jameer Nelson (5)
| Amway Center18,846
| 16–11
|- bgcolor="#ccffcc"
| 28
| February 11
| @ Milwaukee
| 
| Jason Richardson (31)
| Dwight Howard (14)
| Chris Duhon, Hedo Türkoğlu (7)
| Bradley Center17,723
| 17–11
|- bgcolor="#ccffcc"
| 29
| February 13
| Minnesota
| 
| Jason Richardson (17)
| Dwight Howard (7)
| Hedo Türkoğlu (6)
| Amway Center18,846
| 18–11
|- bgcolor="#ccffcc"
| 30
| February 15
| Philadelphia
| 
| Ryan Anderson (27)
| Dwight Howard (14)
| Jameer Nelson (14)
| Amway Center18,846
| 19–11
|- bgcolor="#ccffcc"
| 31
| February 17
| Milwaukee
| 
| Dwight Howard (26)
| Dwight Howard (20)
| Hedo Türkoğlu (7)
| Amway Center18,846
| 20–11
|- bgcolor="#ffcccc"
| 32
| February 19
| @ Miami
| 
| JJ Redick (17)
| Dwight Howard (15)
| Jameer Nelson (4)
| American Airlines Arena20,185
| 20–12
|- bgcolor="#ccffcc"
| 33
| February 20
| @ Milwaukee
| 
| Dwight Howard (28)
| Dwight Howard (16)
| Jameer Nelson (5)
| Bradley Center13,143
| 21–12
|- bgcolor="#ccffcc"
| 34
| February 22
| @ New Jersey
| 
| Dwight Howard (20)
| Dwight Howard (17)
| Jameer Nelson (7)
| Prudential Center15,364
| 22–12
|- bgcolor="#ffcccc"
| 35
| February 23
| @ Atlanta
| 
| JJ Redick (13)
| Dwight Howard (12)
| Chris Duhon, Ish Smith, Hedo Türkoğlu (4)
| Philips Arena14,523
| 22–13
|- align="center"
|colspan="9" bgcolor="#bbcaff"|All-Star Break
|- bgcolor="#ccffcc"
| 36
| February 29
| @ Washington
| 
| Ryan Anderson (23)
| Ryan Anderson (15)
| Hedo Türkoğlu (6)
| Verizon Center18,688
| 23–13

|- bgcolor="#ffcccc"
| 37
| March 1
| Oklahoma City
| 
| Dwight Howard (33)
| Dwight Howard (9)
| Jameer Nelson (9)
| Amway Center18,846
| 23–14
|- bgcolor="#ccffcc"
| 38
| March 3
| Milwaukee
| 
| Dwight Howard (28)
| Dwight Howard (14)
| Jameer Nelson (10)
| Amway Center18,846
| 24–14
|- bgcolor="#ccffcc"
| 39
| March 5
| @ Toronto
| 
| Dwight Howard (36)
| Ryan Anderson, Dwight Howard (13)
| Hedo Türkoğlu (9)
| Air Canada Centre15,392
| 25–14
|- bgcolor="#ffcccc"
| 50
| March 6
| @ Charlotte
| 
| Dwight Howard (15)
| Dwight Howard (17)
| Jameer Nelson (4)
| Time Warner Cable Arena13,110
| 25–15
|- bgcolor="#ccffcc"
| 41
| March 8
| @ Chicago
| 
| Dwight Howard (29)
| Dwight Howard (18)
| Jameer Nelson (7)
| United Center22,127
| 26–15
|- bgcolor="#ccffcc"
| 42
| March 11
| Indiana
| 
| Dwight Howard (30)
| Dwight Howard (13)
| JJ Redick (9)
| Amway Center18,846
| 27–15
|- bgcolor="#ccffcc"
| 43
| March 13
| Miami
| 
| Jameer Nelson (25)
| Dwight Howard (25)
| Hedo Türkoğlu (5)
| Amway Center18,879
| 28–15
|- bgcolor="#ffcccc"
| 44
| March 14
| @ San Antonio
| 
| Jameer Nelson (25)
| Dwight Howard (12)
| Jameer Nelson (7)
| AT&T Center18,581
| 28–16
|- bgcolor="#ccffcc"
| 45
| March 16
| New Jersey
| 
| Dwight Howard (18)
| Dwight Howard (11)
| Jameer Nelson, Hedo Türkoğlu (6)
| Amway Center18,938
| 29–16
|- bgcolor="#ffcccc"
| 46
| March 18
| @ Miami
| 
| Dwight Howard (18)
| Dwight Howard (11)
| Jameer Nelson (6)
| American Airlines Arena20,003
| 29–17
|- bgcolor="#ffcccc"
| 47
| March 19
| Chicago
| 
| Dwight Howard (18)
| Dwight Howard (12)
| Dwight Howard, JJ Redick, Jason Richardson (2)
| Amway Center18,998
| 29–18
|- bgcolor="#ccffcc"
| 48
| March 21
| Phoenix
| 
| Ryan Anderson (29)
| Dwight Howard (16)
| Jason Richardson (5)
| Amway Center18,930
| 30–18
|- bgcolor="#ccffcc"
| 49
| March 23
| Cleveland
| 
| Ryan Anderson (17)
| Dwight Howard (13)
| Jameer Nelson, Hedo Türkoğlu (7)
| Amway Center18,846
| 31–18
|- bgcolor="#ccffcc"
| 50
| March 26
| @ Toronto
| 
| Ryan Anderson (28)
| Dwight Howard (10)
| Hedo Türkoğlu (8)
| Air Canada Centre16,429
| 32–18
|- bgcolor="#ffcccc"
| 51
| March 28
| @ New York
| 
| Jameer Nelson (17)
| Glen Davis (6)
| Jameer Nelson (4)
| Madison Square Garden19,763
| 32–19
|- bgcolor="#ffcccc"
| 52
| March 30
| Dallas
| 
| Jameer Nelson (24)
| Dwight Howard (15)
| Jameer Nelson, Hedo Türkoğlu (4)
| Amway Center18,951
| 32–20

|- bgcolor="#ffcccc"
| 53
| April 1
| Denver
| 
| Jameer Nelson (27)
| Glen Davis (16)
| Jameer Nelson (5)
| Amway Center18,951
| 32–21
|- bgcolor="#ffcccc"
| 54
| April 3
| @ Detroit
| 
| Glen Davis (31)
| Glen Davis (10)
| Chris Duhon (5)
| The Palace of Auburn Hills16,741
| 32–22
|- bgcolor="#ffcccc"
| 55
| April 5
| New York
| 
| Jason Richardson (16)
| Dwight Howard (8)
| Jameer Nelson (5)
| Amway Center19,098
| 32–23
|- bgcolor="#ccffcc"
| 56
| April 7
| @ Philadelphia
| 
| Glen Davis (23)
| Dwight Howard (22)
| Dwight Howard (6)
| Wells Fargo Center19,775
| 33–23
|- bgcolor="#ccffcc"
| 57
| April 9
| Detroit
| 
| Jason Richardson (22)
| Glen Davis (16)
| Jameer Nelson (9)
| Amway Center18,998
| 34–23
|- bgcolor="#ffcccc"
| 58
| April 10
| @ Washington
| 
| Jameer Nelson (19)
| Glen Davis (10)
| Jameer Nelson (7)
| Verizon Center15,355
| 34–24
|- bgcolor="#ffcccc"
| 59
| April 13
| Atlanta
| 
| Glen Davis, Von Wafer (16)
| Glen Davis (9)
| Jameer Nelson, Von Wafer (4)
| Amway Center18,846
| 34–25
|- bgcolor="#ccffcc"
| 60
| April 15
| @ Cleveland
| 
| Jameer Nelson (21)
| Ryan Anderson (13)
| Jameer Nelson (9)
| Quicken Loans Arena16,305
| 35–25
|- bgcolor="#ccffcc"
| 61
| April 16
| Philadelphia
| 
| Ryan Anderson (26)
| Ryan Anderson (16)
| Jameer Nelson (13)
| Amway Center18,846
| 36–25
|- bgcolor="#ffcccc"
| 62
| April 18
| @ Boston
| 
| Glen Davis (27)
| Ryan Anderson (9)
| Jameer Nelson (9)
| TD Garden18,624
| 36–26
|- bgcolor="#ffcccc"
| 63
| April 21
| @ Utah
| 
| Jameer Nelson (23)
| Glen Davis (13)
| Jameer Nelson (11)
| EnergySolutions Arena19,580
| 36–27
|- bgcolor="#ffcccc"
| 64
| April 22
| @ Denver
| 
| Ryan Anderson (24)
| Ryan Anderson (9)
| Jason Richardson, Von Wafer (4)
| Pepsi Center19,155
| 36–28
|- bgcolor="#ccffcc"
| 65
| April 25
| Charlotte
| 
| JJ Redick (31)
| Ryan Anderson (13)
| Jameer Nelson (9)
| Amway Center19,152
| 37–28
|- bgcolor="#ffcccc"
| 66
| April 26
| @ Memphis
| 
| Hedo Türkoğlu (18)
| Earl Clark (9)
| Chris Duhon, Daniel Orton, Ish Smith (3)
| FedExForum17,215
| 37–29

Playoffs

Game log

|- bgcolor="#bbffbb"
| 1
| April 28
| @ Indiana
| 
| Jameer Nelson, Jason Richardson (17)
| Glen Davis (13)
| Jameer Nelson (9)
| Bankers Life Fieldhouse18,165
| 1–0
|- bgcolor="#ffcccc"
| 2
| April 30
| @ Indiana
| 
| Glen Davis (18)
| Glen Davis (10)
| Jameer Nelson, JJ Redick, Jason Richardson (3)
| Bankers Life Fieldhouse18,165
| 1–1
|- bgcolor="#ffcccc"
| 3
| May 2
| Indiana
| 
| Glen Davis (22)
| Quentin Richardson (10)
| Jameer Nelson (5)
| Amway Center18,846
| 1–2
|- bgcolor="#ffcccc"
| 4
| May 5
| Indiana
| 
| Jason Richardson (25)
| Glen Davis (11)
| Jameer Nelson (11)
| Amway Center18,846
| 1–3
|- bgcolor="#ffcccc"
| 5
| May 8
| @ Indiana
| 
| Jameer Nelson (27)
| Glen Davis (8)
| Jameer Nelson (5)
| Bankers Life Fieldhouse18,165
| 1–4

Player statistics

Regular season

|- align="center" bgcolor=""
| 
| 61 ||style="background:#000000;color:silver;" |61 || 32.2 || .439 || .393 || .877 || 7.7 || .9 || .8 || .4 || 16.1
|- align="center" bgcolor=""
| 
| 45 || 1 || 12.4 || .367 ||  || .724 || 2.8 || .4 || .3 || .7 || 2.7
|- align="center" bgcolor=""
| 
| 61 || 13 || 23.4 || .421 || .143 || .683 || 5.4 || .8 || .7 || .3 || 9.3
|- align="center" bgcolor=""
| 
| 63 || 9 || 19.5 || .419 ||style="background:#000000;color:silver;" |.420 || .810 || 1.6 || 2.4 || .6 || .1 || 3.8
|- align="center" bgcolor=""
| 
| 14 || 0 || 6.0 || .290 || .154 || .000 || .9 || .1 || .1 || .2 || 1.4
|- align="center" bgcolor=""
| 
| 54 || 54 ||style="background:#000000;color:silver;" |38.3 ||style="background:#000000;color:silver;" |.573 || .000 || .491 ||style="background:#000000;color:silver;" |14.5 || 1.9 ||style="background:#000000;color:silver;" |1.5 ||style="background:#000000;color:silver;" |2.1 ||style="background:#000000;color:silver;" |20.6
|- align="center" bgcolor=""
| 
| 9 || 0 || 12.7 || .227 || .143 || .500 || .6 || .8 || .2 || .0 || 1.3
|- align="center" bgcolor=""
| 
| 17 || 0 || 6.8 || .480 || .000 || .474 || .9 || .3 || .4 || .0 || 1.9
|- align="center" bgcolor=""
| 
| 57 || 57 || 29.9 || .427 || .377 || .807 || 3.2 ||style="background:#000000;color:silver;" |5.7 || .7 || .1 || 11.9
|- align="center" bgcolor=""
| 
| 16 || 2 || 11.7 || .567 || .000 || .440 || 2.4 || .3 || .5 || .6 || 2.8
|- align="center" bgcolor=""
| 
|style="background:#000000;color:silver;" |65 || 22 || 27.2 || .425 || .418 ||style="background:#000000;color:silver;" |.911 || 2.3 || 2.5 || .4 || .1 || 11.6
|- align="center" bgcolor=""
| 
| 54 || 54 || 29.5 || .408 || .368 || .594 || 3.6 || 2.0 || 1.0 || .4 || 11.6
|- align="center" bgcolor=""
| 
| 48 || 3 || 18.0 || .376 || .347 || .833 || 2.6 || .8 || .6 || .1 || 4.5
|- align="center" bgcolor=""
| 
| 20 || 0 || 8.6 || .373 || .250 || .750 || 1.3 || 1.6 || .6 || .1 || 2.3
|- align="center" bgcolor=""
| 
| 53 || 53 || 31.2 || .415 || .353 || .705 || 3.8 || 4.4 || .8 || .3 || 10.9
|- align="center" bgcolor=""
| 
| 33 || 1 || 14.2 || .452 || .359 || .704 || 1.4 || .9 || .3 || .1 || 5.9
|}
  Statistics with the Orlando Magic.

Playoffs

|- align="center" bgcolor=""
| 
| 5 || 5 || 34.4 || .341 || .400 || .857 || 4.6 || .8 || .6 || .4 || 9.6
|- align="center" bgcolor=""
| 
| 5 || 0 || 17.6 || .444 ||  || .571 || 6.6 || .2 || .4 || 1.0 || 4.0
|- align="center" bgcolor=""
| 
| 5 || 5 || 38.0 || .438 ||  || .773 || 9.2 || .8 || .6 || 1.2 || 19.0
|- align="center" bgcolor=""
| 
| 5 || 0 || 12.2 || .200 || .333 || .000 || 1.4 || 1.8 || 1.0 || .2 || .6
|- align="center" bgcolor=""
| 
| 1 || 0 || 5.0 || .000 ||  ||  || .0 || .0 || .0 || .0 || .0
|- align="center" bgcolor=""
| 
| 5 || 5 || 36.4 || .392 || .320 || .750 || 3.8 || 6.6 || .8 || .2 || 15.6
|- align="center" bgcolor=""
| 
| 4 || 0 || 2.3 ||  ||  || 1.000 || .5 || .0 || .0 || .0 || 1.0
|- align="center" bgcolor=""
| 
| 5 || 0 || 24.6 || .432 || .211 || .857 || 1.0 || 3.2 || .2 || .0 || 10.8
|- align="center" bgcolor=""
| 
| 5 || 5 || 29.6 || .396 || .370 || .417 || 3.8 || 1.0 || 1.2 || .4 || 11.4
|- align="center" bgcolor=""
| 
| 5 || 0 || 14.8 || .333 || .286 ||  || 4.4 || .4 || .2 || .0 || 2.4
|- align="center" bgcolor=""
| 
| 1 || 0 || 5.0 ||  ||  ||  || 1.0 || .0 || .0 || .2 || .0
|- align="center" bgcolor=""
| 
| 5 || 5 || 32.4 || .366 || .417 || .636 || 2.8 || 2.4 || 1.0 || .8 || 8.4
|- align="center" bgcolor=""
| 
| 1 || 0 || 6.0 || .600 ||  ||  || 1.0 || .0 || .0 || .0 || 6.0
|}

Awards and records
 Ryan Anderson won the NBA Most Improved Player Award.
 Dwight Howard was selected to the All-NBA First Team and NBA All-Defensive First Team and was named Eastern Conference Player of the Week (January 16 – January 22).
 Dwight Howard attempted a record 39 free throws against the Golden State Warriors, breaking Wilt Chamberlain's record of 34 set in 1962.

All-Star
 Dwight Howard made his sixth All-Star appearance at the 2012 NBA All-Star Game held in Orlando.
 Ryan Anderson participated in the Three-Point Contest.
 Jameer Nelson participated in the  Shooting Stars Competition along Phoenix Mercury player Marie Ferdinand-Harris and former Orlando Magic player Dennis Scott.

Injuries and disciplinary actions
 Hedo Türkoğlu underwent surgery to repair a facial fracture sustained during a game against the New York Knicks on April 5 and missed the remainder of the regular season.
 Glen Davis was suspended 2 games by the team for conduct detrimental to the team. A month later he was fined US$35,000 by the league for making an obscene gesture in a game against the Toronto Raptors.
 Hedo Türkoğlu was suspended 1 game by the league for making intentional contact with an official during a game against the Chicago Bulls.
 Chris Duhon was suspended 1 game by the team for violating team rules.
 In April, Dwight Howard underwent surgery to repair a herniated disc in his back and was out for the remainder of the season.

Transactions

Overview

Trades

Free agents

Many players signed with teams from other leagues due to the 2011 NBA lockout. FIBA allows players under NBA contracts to sign and play for teams from other leagues if the contracts have opt-out clauses that allow the players to return to the NBA if the lockout ends. The Chinese Basketball Association, however, only allows its clubs to sign foreign free agents who could play for at least the entire season.

References

Orlando Magic seasons
Orlando Magic
2011 in sports in Florida
2012 in sports in Florida